Boys24 ( 'Sonyeon Ishipsa', stylized as BOYS24) was a South Korean pre-debut boy band formed by CJ E&M through a 2016 survival show with the same name. There were twenty-seven members in the group divided into four units. The group performed regular shows in their own concert hall, with the debut of the final eight members IN2IT on October 26, 2017.

The first promotional unit (later dubbed Unit Black) who were selected from the 'BOYS24 The 1st Semi-Final' concert consists of Park Doha, Hwang Inho, Oh Jinseok, Kim Sunghyun, Kim Yonghyun, Jung Yeontae, Yoo Youngdoo and Han Hyunuk. The unit release their first single album, Steal Your Heart on April 11, 2017 on Mnet's M! Countdown with the song title "Steal Your Heart".

After completing 260 concerts, the final group was selected from "The Final", consist of eight members: Yoo Youngdoo (Yoo Jiahn), Jeong Yeontae, Hwang Inho, Han Hyunuk, Isaac Voo, Lee Inpyo, Kim Jinsub and Kim Sunghyun. They debuted on October 26, 2017 as IN2IT.

History 
On January 10, 2016 CJ E&M announced that they were investing 25 billion won ($20.6 million) over the next three years in a new boy band to perform throughout the year at a permanent venue. CJ E&M had named the boy band and project name “Boys24”, to air the whole process from selecting members to performing in front of audiences.

Concept of Boys24

First, Ahn Seok-joon set the stage of 'Boys24' as four stages, the first being 'excavation'. Of the total of 5500 applicants, 49 were selected by Mnet.com as untreated gemstones. The second stage was 'competition'. The unfinished 49 people formed a total of seven unit teams, where they would vividly confirm their intense competition. The third stage was 'growth', a process of the birth of a 24-member Boys24, which would be confirmed in the theater. The final stage was 'evolution'. It could be said that they had evolved to become a crystal, and among the 24 people, a few select members who had the highest level in all aspects would make their debut as an idol group. They would enter the world of 'pro' and start full-scale activity.

January 2016 - August 2017

The auditions were held from January 18 to February 19. However, due to the large  number of applicants, which was more than 4000, the final date of the audition was shifted to March 11.
Forty-nine participants who passed the audition competed in a survival show which began airing on 18 June 2016.

After the survival show ended, twenty-eight people were selected as Boys24 members, and the group held their concert three to five days a week in rotation. The concert was set to take place at the Boys 24 X Booto Hall, also known as Mesa Hall, near Shinsegae's duty-free shop in Myeongdong, Seoul. The first concert was held on September 22, 2016.

On August 25, 2016 the group made a special appearance at M! Countdown performing their song "Rising Star". In September 2016, Yellow Unit from the group were chosen as the models for 새싹보리 a barley drink, sold by CJ Health Care. On September 10, 2016, Unit Yellow and Unit Sky from the group held their first fan meeting in Hong Kong. On September 27 and 28, 2016, the group held "Boys24 Live Preview" press call at their own hall to promote their own concert.

On November 2, 2016, Unit Yellow's music video for "E" was released as an award for the unit for being MVP Unit. The track also released on music sites and charted No.1 on Mnet's music chart. On November 3, 2016, Unit Yellow and Unit Sky made a special appearance at M! Countdown performing their song "E". A week later all units from the group made a special appearance again on M! Countdown performing "E".

On December 1, 2016, the group announced that they would collaborate with DIA TV as part of Monthly Idol project broadcasting with various creators from DIA TV. On December 7, 2016, the group released two versions of their first live album from their concert BOYS24 LIVE in CD format. The first version of the album was recorded by Unit White and Unit Green while the second version of the album was recorded by Unit Sky and Unit Yellow.

On February 14, 2017, Lee Hwayoung was removed from the group and his contract was cancelled following his leaked audio controversy for making offensive comments about fans.

On March 5, 2017, the group held 'BOYS24 The 1st Semi-Final' concert at the Hall of Peace at Kyung Hee University in Dongdaemun, Seoul. The concert was broadcast live on Mnet and M2. Through the concert Park Doha, Jin Sungho, Hwang Inho, Oh Jinseok, Kim Sunghyun, Kim Yonghyun, Jung Yeontae, Yoo Youngdoo and Han Hyunuk were selected to promote as promotional unit for three months. The promotional unit would perform on KCON Japan, music programs, and entertainment shows.

On March 10, 2017, CJ E&M and Liveworks announced that Jin Sungho to leave his position as part of the first promotional unit but still remain in the group following controversies about his past actions in junior high school. The first promotional unit would move forward as an eight-member group.

On March 23, 2017, the group announced that the first promotional unit official name was Unit Black. The name was voted by fans through a team naming event that was announced on the group's official fan cafe. On April 11, 2017, the unit released their first single album, Steal Your Heart on Mnet's M! Countdown with their song "Steal Your Heart".

On August 12, 2017, the group held 'BOYS24 The Final' concert at Olympic Park Olympic Hall, Seoul, marking the end of Boys24 survival project after 1 year and 6 months. The concert was broadcast live through V Live. Hwang Inho, Jung Yeontae, Kim Jinsub, Kim Sunghyun, Yoo Youngdoo, Isaac Voo, and Jin Sungho were announced as final group members by fans vote, while Lee Inpyo and Han Hyunuk were selected as Wild Card directly by company, completing final line-up as nine-member group. The final group would start their overseas promotions right away, starting with visiting Japan on August 26 followed by Korea Tourism Organization invitation to Kazakhstan in September.

On August 14, 2017, MMO Entertainment, who manage the debut team, announced that Jin Sungho to had left the team due to differing musical point of view.

Survival show 

The survival show with the same name as the group was a 2016 reality boy group unit survival show that aired every Saturday 10pm on Mnet and tvN. It was a large-scale project in which the units of a selected number of members would be produced from a pool of 49 free-agents.

The show consists of 8 episodes, airing from June 18, 2016 to August 6, 2016. The highest ratings for this show is 0.8%.

MC & masters 
Oh Yeon-seo (MC)
Shin Hye-sung (Director)
Lee Min-woo (Director)
Jeon Bong-jin (Vocal Master)
Ha Hwi-dong (Dance Master)
Vasco (Rap Master)
Yoo Jae-hwan (Special Vocal Master)
Basick (Special Rap Master)
Choi Young-joon (Special Dance Master)

Winners 
The winners of BOYS24 are Unit Yellow, Unit White, Unit Green, and Unit Sky. Unit Yellow were selected as the MVP team and were awarded 200 million won (approximately $171,220) of investment into their music production and unit activities promotion. Sangmin from Unit Sky withdrew from BOYS24 due to personal reasons, which included health issues. Online votes were held to pick five contestants who were formerly eliminated on the show to replace Sangmin's position. The votes took place August 10–15 with the winners of the vote being announced on August 16. The five contestants with the highest votes were Jin Sungho, Jung Yeontae, Han Hyunuk, Kim Sunghyun, and Tak Jinkyu. Jin Sungho was added to Unit Green, Jung Yeontae was added to Unit Yellow, Kim Sunghyun was added to Unit White, Han Hyunuk and Tak Jinkyu were added to Unit Sky.

Episodes Guide

Episodes Ratings 

Episode 1 : 2016.6.18 : TOP7 selection : n/a
Episode 2 : 2016.6.25 : TOP7 chose Unit members and mission : 0.8%
Episode 3 : 2016.7.02 : Unit mission : 0.6%
Episode 4 : 2016.6.09 : First Unit Mission : n/a
Episode 5 : 2016.6.16 : Second Unit Mission : n/a
Episode 6 : 2016.6.23 : Third Unit Mission : n/a
Episode 7 : 2016.6.30 : Third Unit Mission : n/a
Episode 8 : 2016.8.06 : Final Unit Mission : 0.8%

Members 
At the final episode of the survival show, the group originally had twenty-four members that were separated in to four units. The units were Unit Yellow, Unit White, Unit Green, and Unit Sky with each unit containing six members. However, shortly after the survival show ended Lee Sangmin withdrew from the group then five eliminated members were revived to replace his position. The revival made each unit consist of seven members and the total group then consisted of twenty-eight members. Unit Yellow consists Jung Yeontae, Lee Louoon, Choi Seonghwan, Oh Jinseok, Kim Hongin, Shin Jaemin, and Lee Changmin. Unit White consists of Park Doha, Yoo Youngdoo, Hwang Inho, Choi Jaehyun, Lee Haejoon, Kim Jinsub, and Kim Sunghyun. Unit Green consists of Jin Sungho, Go Jihyeong, Choi Chani, Jung Minhwan, Lee Inpyo, Kang San, and Chae Hocheol. Unit Sky consists of Tak Jinkyu, Han Hyunuk, Isaac Voo, Park Yongkwon, Kim Yonghyun, Lee Woojin, and Lee Hwayoung. Lee Louoon, Park Doha, Lee Inpyo, and Kim Yonghyun were leaders of their respective units. This Unit line-up performed from September 22, 2016, to March 19, 2017.

On November 20, 2016, the group announced that they would perform with the new line-up that was called Collabo line-up. The Collabo line-up swapped: four members between Unit White and Unit Sky; three members between Unit Yellow and Unit Green. Collabo Yellow consists of Lee Louoon, Choi Seonghwan, Lee Changmin, Kang San, Jung Minhwan, Jin Sungho, and Chae Hocheol. Collabo White consists of Park Doha, Hwang Inho, Lee Haejoon, Kim Sunghyun, Han Hyunuk, Isaac Voo, and Lee Woojin. Collabo Green consists of Go Jihyeong, Lee Inpyo, Choi Chani, Jung Yeontae, Oh Jinseok, Kim Hongin, and Shin Jaemin. Collabo Sky consists of Tak Jinkyu, Kim Yonghyun, Park Yongkwon, Choi Jaehyun, Yoo Youngdoo, Kim Jinsub, and Lee Hwayoung. The Collabo line-up performed from December 7, 2016, to March 14, 2017.

On February 10, 2017, Lee Hwayoung stopped performing on concert then was removed from the group on February 14, 2017. His departures made Unit Sky and Collabo Sky consist of six members and the total group consists twenty-seven members.

On March 5, 2017, the group announced new units which are Unit White, Unit Red, Unit Blue, and Unit Purple. The respective leaders from each unit are Jin Sungho, Hwang Inho, Park Doha, and Kim Sunghyun who were chosen from the members with the highest points voted by fans. Unit White consists of Park Doha, Yoo Youngdoo, Oh Jinseok, Lee Louoon, Isaac Voo, Go Jihyeong, and Kang San. Unit Red consists of Jin Sungho, Han Hyunuk, Tak Jinkyu, Choi Chani, Lee Haejoon, Kim Hongin, and Park Yongkwon. Unit Blue consists of Hwang Inho, Kim Yonghyun, Jung Minhwan, Lee Inpyo, Shin Jaemin, Lee Changmin, and Chae Hocheol. Unit Purple consists of Kim Sunghyun, Jung Yeontae, Choi Seonghwan, Choi Jaehyun, Kim Jinsub and Lee Woojin. This new units line-up would perform starting from March 24, 2017.

On March 10, 2017, Jin Sungho voluntarily left his position from Unit Red leader. On March 24, 2017, the group announced that Tak Jinkyu to be the leader of Unit Red for temporary. On July 5, CJ E&M announced that Oh Jinseok would not be participating in the final of Boys24, but would finish the BOYS24 Live Concert up until August 6.

Current members

Promotional unit 

Unit Black (first Apromotional unit)

Debuting members (the final)

Past members 

Post-survival show departures

Eliminated on The Survival Show

Elimination 

 Color key

 Notes

Timeline 

Unit White

Unit Red

Unit Blue

Unit Purple

Unit Yellow

Unit Green

Unit Sky

Discography

Singles

Single albums

Live albums

Music videos

Filmography
 BOYS24 (Mnet, tvN, 2016)
 Wiki BOYS24 (Mnet, 2017)
 BOYS24 The 1st Semi Final (Mnet, 2017)
 BOYS24 The Final (Naver/V Live App, 2017)

Concerts & Tours

Main Concert
 BOYS24 LIVE CONCERT: Seoul, South Korea (September 22nd, 2016 - August 6, 2017)
 BOYS24 The 1st Semi-Final: Seoul, South Korea (March 5th, 2017)
 BOYS24 The Final: Seoul, South Korea (August 12, 2017)

Join Concert
KCON '17: Tokyo, Japan (May 21, 2017)
IdolCon '17: Seoul, South Korea (May 26–27, 2017)

Schedule

 Note

 Note

Set List

Other activities

Endorsements

Overseas Fan Meeting and Showcase

Awards and nominations

References

External links
 

Mnet (TV channel) original programming
Talent shows
2016 South Korean television series debuts
2016 South Korean television series endings
South Korean boy bands
Music competitions in South Korea